The  is an archaeological site containing the ruins of a late Kofun period (6th century AD) settlement located in what is now part of the city of Tendō, Yamagata in the Tōhoku region of Japan. The site was designated a National Historic Site of Japan in 1987.

Overview
It was discovered in 1985 in conjunction with a prefectural farmland improvement project. The site now covers an area of 45,000 square meters and is a rare example of a rural settlement before the formation of Mutsu Province. Excavation surveys confirmed the foundations of 16 pillared buildings, two of which appear to have been granaries, and 14 of which were residences, along with wells, rice paddies and a dam to create a pond. The settlement area was protected by a wooden palisade.

It is located a short walk from the Nishinumata Archaeological Park bus stop on the Tendō city bus from Tendō Station on the Yamagata Shinkansen.

Gallery

See also
List of Historic Sites of Japan (Yamagata)

References

External links

Tendō Nishinumata Archaeological Park official site  
Tendō city touristm home page  

Kofun period
History of Yamagata Prefecture
Tendō, Yamagata
Archaeological sites in Japan
Historic Sites of Japan
1985 archaeological discoveries